The International Centre for Birds of Prey, formerly the National Birds of Prey Centre, in the United Kingdom houses a large collection of birds of prey with over 60 species of owls, eagles and hawks. It works towards the conservation of birds of prey through education, captive breeding, research and rehabilitation. The centre is located at Boulsdon near Newent in Gloucestershire. The Director is Jemima (Glasier) Parry-Jones.

In March 2013 a new branch, the National Centre for Birds of Prey, was opened at Duncombe Park in Helmsley, North Yorkshire.

History
The ICBP was originally established, as the Falconry Centre, by Phillip Glasier as a specialised zoo containing only birds of prey, including falcons, hawks, eagles and owls. It had the aim of educating people about birds of prey and their value in the world. It also aimed to teach falconry. It first opened to the public on 25 May 1967.

References

External links
International Centre for Birds of Prey
National Centre for Birds of Prey
BBC archive film of the Newent Birds of Prey Centre from 1987

Zoos in England
Zoos established in 1967
Bird parks
Bird conservation organizations
Tourist attractions in Gloucestershire
1967 establishments in the United Kingdom
Falconry
Raptor organizations
Buildings and structures in Gloucestershire
Newent